Old School Flava is the second studio album by American hip hop group the Treacherous Three. It was released in 1994 via Wrap Records and was produced by DJ Easy Lee, Ced Gee, Clark Kent, Joseph Carne, Ken Fambro, Kool Moe Dee, LA Sunshine, Rahiem, Special K, Jasz and T La Rock. It featured guest appearances from Big Daddy Kane, Chuck D, Doug E. Fresh, Grandmaster Caz, Heavy D, Melle Mel and Tito.

Track listing

Personnel

Mohandas Dewese – main artist, producer, mixing (tracks: 1–2, 4–6)
Kevin Keaton – main artist, producer, mixing (track 7)
Lamar Hill – main artist, producer
Theodore Moyé – executive producer, mixing (tracks: 3–4, 6, 8–10)
Antonio Hardy – featured artist (track 8)
Carlton Douglas Ridenhour – featured artist (track 8)
Dwight Errington Myers – featured artist (track 8)
Melvin Glover – featured artist (track 8)
Wilfredo Dones – featured artist (track 8)
Curtis Fisher – featured artist (track 8)
Douglas E. Davis – featured artist (track 10)
John Otto – guitar (track 1), artwork
Jimmy O'Neill – bass (track 2), mixing (tracks: 1–2, 5, 7), recording
Ken Fambro – producer (tracks: 1, 3, 5, 8–9)
Rodolfo Antonio Franklin – producer & mixing (track 10)
Cedric Ulmont Miller – producer (track 6)
Guy Todd Williams – producer (track 4)
Joseph Carne – producer (track 2)
Clarence Ronnie Keaton – additional producer (track 7)
Jasz – co-producer (track 7)
Butch Williams – mixing (track 10)
Bruce Powell Bennett – recording
Joseph Saddler – recording
Tony Smalios – recording
John Briglevich – recording
Mark Allen – assistant engineer
Steve Briglevich – assistant engineer
Scott Eraas – assistant engineer
Tamara Rafkin – photography

References

External links 

1994 albums
Treacherous Three albums
Albums produced by Clark Kent (producer)